Əzizli (also, Azizli, known as Aronovka until 1992) is a village in the Khachmaz District of Azerbaijan. The village forms part of the municipality of Khaspoladoba.

References 

Populated places in Khachmaz District